Nassiba Laghouati (born 23 January 1976) is an Algerian football former player and current manager. She played as a midfielder and has been a member of the Algeria women's national team.

Club career
Laghouati has played for ASE Alger Centre and Affak Relizane in Algeria. She has been player-coach in the latter.

International career
Laghouati capped for Algeria at senior level during the 2006 African Women's Championship.

References

External links

1976 births
Living people
Footballers from Algiers
Algerian women's footballers
Women's association football midfielders
Algeria women's international footballers
Algerian football managers
Female association football managers
Women's association football managers
21st-century Algerian people